One Big Day is the third and final album released by the band Face to Face. The album was somewhat of a departure for the band, as it showcased the more country-rock material that principal songwriter Angelo Petraglia would later become known for. The group disbanded shortly after the album's release in 1988.

Track listing
All songs written by Laurie Sargent and Angelo Petraglia except as indicated.

"As Forever as You"
"Change in the Wind" (Petraglia)
"A Place Called Home"
"Never Had a Reason" (Sargent, Petraglia, Stuart Kimball)
"The Day I Was Born" (Petraglia)
"She's a Contradiction"
"I Believe in You"
"Ever Since Eve (Blood Gone Bad)"
"Some Stories" (Petraglia)
"Grass Is Greener"

References

1988 albums
Face to Face (new wave band) albums
Mercury Records albums